Khara-Kutul (Khara Khütel) is a rural locality (a settlement) in Zaigrayevsky District, Republic of Buryatia, Russia. The population was 181 as of 2010. There are 4 streets.

Geography 
Khara-Kutul is located 19 km northeast of Zaigrayevo (the district's administrative centre) by road. Tarbagatay is the nearest rural locality.

References 

Rural localities in Zaigrayevsky District